The shining sunbird (Cinnyris habessinicus) is a species of bird in the family Nectariniidae.

Subspecies
 Cinnyris habessinicus habessinicus (Hemprich and Ehrenberg)
 Cinnyris habessinicus turkanae van Someren
 Cinnyris habessinicus alter Neumann

Description
Cinnyris habessinicus are highly dimorphic and have three distinct plumages, juvenal, immature and adult. Adult males in breeding plumage have brilliant metallic green upperparts and throat, a violet or blue crown, a bright red band across the breast with a narrow line of metallic blue, and blue-black wings and tail. The female are mainly gray or brown. These small sunbirds mainly feed on nectar.

Distribution
It is found in Djibouti, Egypt, Eritrea, Ethiopia, Kenya, Somalia, Sudan, and Uganda.

Habitat
This species prefers rocky or sandy areas and dry river beds with Acacia and Ziziphus trees.

References

External links
Biolib
Bird Life
Ibc.lynxeds

shining sunbird
Birds of the Horn of Africa
shining sunbird
Taxonomy articles created by Polbot
Taxa named by Christian Gottfried Ehrenberg